Crisson Mine was a gold mine in Lumpkin County, Georgia, USA, located just east of Dahlonega.  Like many mines in the area, the property  probably started as a placer mine during the Georgia Gold Rush.  Once the placer deposits had been exhausted, an open pit gold mine was established in 1847 and commercial operations continued until the early 1980s. A small stamp mill was also established here. Much of the gold used for the gold leaf dome of the Georgia State Capitol was mined at this mine, which was among the most productive mines in the Georgia Gold Belt.  The mine is located just north of the site of the Consolidated Mine, which is itself north of the Calhoun Mine.  

In 1969, the owners of Crisson Mine opened to the public to allow tourists to pan for gold.  The ore sold for panning is still crushed by the stamp mill, which is now well over 100 years old.  It is likely that panning the ore provided at the mine will yield small amounts of gold (flakes, specks, small nuggets).

External links
Crisson Mine Website
Crisson Mine on Mindat.org
Crisson Mine on TopoQuest.com
Map to the Crisson Mine
"Thar's Gold in Them Thar Hills': Gold and Gold Mining in Georgia, 1830s-1940s from the Digital Library of Georgia

Gold mines in Georgia
Mines in Lumpkin County, Georgia
Surface mines in the United States
Tourist attractions in Lumpkin County, Georgia
Stamp mills